Gladwyne is a suburban community in Lower Merion Township, Montgomery County, Pennsylvania, United States along the historic Philadelphia Main Line. In 2018, Gladwyne was ranked the sixth richest ZIP code (using 2015 IRS data) in the country in a study by Bloomberg BusinessWeek. The population was 4,071 at the 2010 US census. As Gladwyne is neither an incorporated area nor a census-designated place, all data are for the ZIP code 19035, with which the community is coterminous.

There are four churches, a synagogue, a library, two schools, the Gladwyne fire company, the Gladwyne Civic Association, the Stony Lane Swim Club, playgrounds, parks, businesses, and retail shops within the confines of Gladwyne. The historic Guard House Inn is also located within Gladwyne. The village is also home to the Philadelphia Country Club on its periphery, Merion Cricket Club, and to The Courts, a private tennis club. Because the town was early to preserve space and has received many donations of land, developers have not subdivided the area into more typical suburban developments, so the area retains a mixture of farm, colonial town, and late 19th/early 20th housing uncharacteristic of other Main Line communities.

The Lower Merion Conservancy plays a significant role in protecting the local heritage and maintains its office in Gladwyne's Rolling Hill Park.

History
Like the rest of the region, Gladwyne, known until 1891 as "Merion Square", originally was settled by Welsh Quakers beginning in 1682. It was given its new name to lessen confusion with the many "Merions" in the area, including the town of Merion, Lower Merion Township, and Upper Merion Township, and in imitation of the Welsh names of adjoining towns, although its new name was meaningless in Welsh. Twenty-four mills operated along Mill Creek through the beginning of the twentieth century, and the major road through residential Gladwyne runs along the banks of the creek. After the American Civil War and following construction of the Pennsylvania Railroad's Main Line west from Center City, wealthy Philadelphians located many of their summer homes there.

The development of the Schuylkill Expressway (I-76) in the 1960s and the subsequent development of King of Prussia as a major business center increased Gladwyne's appeal, as it was the Main Line town situated closest to the Expressway and midway between King of Prussia and Center City Philadelphia. The Gladwyne Elementary School was built in 1958 to accommodate the children of these new residents and the Gladwyne Free Library (part of the Lower Merion Library System) was renovated and expanded as well. Yet the core of the village, built originally at the convergence of Youngsford and Righter's Mill Roads during the latter part of the eighteenth century, remained essentially the same, allowing Gladwyne to retain all of its original historic character and at the same time enjoy the conveniences of modern suburban living, such as a centrally located supermarket with ample parking, pharmacy, tavern, and restaurants.

The Gladwyne Historic District was added to the National Register of Historic Places in 1980.

Geography

According to the United States Census Bureau, the community has a total area of 4.9 square miles (12.8 km2), all land. It is primarily rolling hills in topography.

Demographics
As of the census of 2000, there were 4,050 people, 1,476 households, and 1,057 families residing in the community. The population density was 820.0 people per square mile (316.7/km2). There were 1,538 housing units at an average density of 311.4/sq mi (120.3/km2). The racial makeup of the village was 97.22% Caucasian, 2.34% Asian, 0.77% African American, 0.32% from other races, and 0.69% from two or more races. 1.09% of the population were Hispanic or Latino of any race.

There were 1,476 households, out of which 32.2% had children under the age of 18 living with them, 67.3% were married couples living together, 4.9% had a female householder with no husband present, and 26.4% were non-families. 22.8% of all households were made up of individuals, and 16.9% had someone living alone who was 65 years of age or older. The average household size was 2.53 and the average family size was 3.98.

In the community, the population was spread out, with 22.8% under the age of 18, 2.0% from 18 to 24, 18.9% from 25 to 44, 28.1% from 45 to 64, and 28.2% who were 65 years of age or older. The median age was 48.8 years. For every 100 females, there were 84.1 males. For every 100 females age 18 and over, there were 80.6 males.

The median income for a household in the community was $159,905, and the median income for a family was $200,000. Males had a median income of $100,000+ versus $51,103 for females. The per capita income for the community was $90,940. About 2.1% of families and 4.1% of the population were below the poverty line, including 1.0% of those under age 18 and 11.1% of those age 65 or over.

Education
Children living in Gladwyne are zoned to schools in the Lower Merion School District unless they go to private school.
They are zoned to Gladwyne Elementary School, Welsh Valley Middle School in Penn Valley and Harriton High School, located in Bryn Mawr. Gladwyne Elementary is in Gladwyne itself as is Gladwyne Montessori and the Wetherill School. 
There are numerous elite private schools in the area, such as Shipley School, Agnes Irwin School, Baldwin School, Haverford School, and Episcopal Academy, among others.

Notable people
 Henry H. Arnold – America's only General of the Air Force
 Richie Ashburn – MLB Hall of Famer, Philadelphia Phillies star, and longtime Phillies broadcaster. The baseball field at Gladwyne Park is named "Richie Ashburn Field" in his memory.
 Ralph L. Brinster, PhD – American biologist, pioneer in the development of techniques for manipulating the cellular and genetic composition of early mouse embryos and creator of the Brinster cell culture medium
 John Thompson Dorrance – American chemist who invented condensed soup; president of the Campbell Soup Company from 1914 to 1930
 J. Presper Eckert – Designer and patentee of the first general-purpose computer at the University of Pennsylvania
 Allen Iverson – NBA basketball player formerly of the Philadelphia 76ers, Denver Nuggets, and Detroit Pistons
 Mark Josephson, M.D. – Pioneering American cardiologist and writer, cofounder of cardiac electrophysiology, now professor of medicine at Harvard Medical School in Boston
 Kyle Korver – NBA basketball player, formerly of the Philadelphia 76ers and Atlanta Hawks.  Currently a member of the Cleveland Cavaliers.
 Mitchell Lazar – MD/PhD world-renowned scientist and chief of endocrinology/metabolism at the Hospital of the University of Pennsylvania
 Carter Merbreier – Creator and co-host (Captain Noah) of the children's television series, Captain Noah and His Magical Ark
 Patricia Merbreier – Co-host (Mrs. Noah) and puppeteer of Captain Noah and His Magical Ark
 Martin Meyerson, PhD – American city planner and president of the University of Pennsylvania from 1970 to 1981
 Albert Nipon – American fashion designer, clothing manufacturer, and convicted tax fraud
 Teddy Pendergrass – late R&B singer
 J. Howard Pew – son of the founder of the Sun Oil Corporation, Joseph Newton Pew, and chairman of its board of directors
 Jonathan M. Raines – American psychiatrist and psychoanalyst
 M. Night Shyamalan – film director
 Gil Stein - Former NHL President (1992-93), currently lives in an assistaed living community in Gladwyne.
 Robert Summers, PhD, and Anita Summers, PhD – U.S. economists at the University of Pennsylvania and parents of former Harvard president, U.S. Treasury secretary, and Obama chief economic adviser Lawrence H. Summers
 Chase Utley – MLB player, Philadelphia Phillies star
 Silas L. Warner, M.D. – American psychiatrist and writer on personality disorders in adults and children

Points of interest
 1690 House (built 1683), the oldest standing structure in Lower Merion Township, incorporating remnants of a log cabin built by John Roberts for the Roberts Mill at the convergence of Mill Creek and Old Gulph Roads
 Bridlewild Trail, a set of trails extending  through the Henry, Rolling Hill, Idlewild Farms, Saunders Woods, and other preserved spaces. The trail is open to residents, horses, and leashed pets.
 Cedar Crest, mansion and estate of John T. Dorrance, Jr. Now called "Linden Hill."
 Henry Foundation for Botanical Research, a botanical garden
 Rolling Hill Park, a  park on Mill Creek, with historic mill building ruins, purchased from Walter Pew by the Lower Merion Township
 Idlewild Farm Complex, a  farm with buildings, donated to Natural Lands
 Saunders Woods, a 25 acre nature preserve with colonial house and barn
 Woodmont, mansion and estate of Alan Wood, Jr., now a shrine to evangelist Father Divine

References

External links
 Gladwyne Civic Association Website
 Stony Lane Swim Club
 Lower Merion Historical Society
 Gladwyne Free Library

Philadelphia Main Line
Lower Merion Township, Pennsylvania
Unincorporated communities in Montgomery County, Pennsylvania
Unincorporated communities in Pennsylvania